Varujan Kojian (March 12, 1935; Beirut, LebanonMarch 4, 1993; Santa Barbara, California) was an Armenian-American conductor from Beirut, Lebanon. He studied at the Conservatoire de Paris and by 1956 joined Los Angeles Philharmonic where he became an assistant concertmaster. He began his job as a conductor in Vienna in mid '60s. From 1973 to 1980 he was the guest conductor at the Royal Opera in Stockholm and during the same years was also working as an associate conductor for the Seattle Symphony. From 1980 to 1983 he was director of the Utah Symphony and a year later became a member of the Santa Barbara Symphony Orchestra of which he became director from 1985-1993 before he died at the age of 57.

References

External links
Varujan Kojian

American male conductors (music)
1935 births
1993 deaths
Conservatoire de Paris alumni
Musicians from Beirut
20th-century American conductors (music)
20th-century American male musicians